Gunton's Magazine was an American journal edited by George Gunton. It focused on "practical economics and political science." It was founded in 1891 as The Social Economist and was renamed Gunton's Magazine of American Economics and Political Science in 1896 before being shortened to Gunton's Magazine in 1898. The journal was published on a monthly basis and had a Republican stance. It ceased publication in 1904.

References

Further reading
 Hathi Trust. Gunton's magazine. New York: Institute of Social Economics, 1891-

Business magazines published in the United States  
Defunct magazines published in the United States
Magazines established in 1891  
Magazines disestablished in 1904
Monthly magazines published in the United States
Magazines published in New York City